Tapio Sammalkangas (born March 16, 1980) is a Finnish former professional ice hockey defenceman.

Career statistics

External links

Living people
Ässät players
Ilves players
Tappara players
Fresno Falcons players
AaB Ishockey players
1980 births
Finnish ice hockey defencemen
Ice hockey people from Tampere